Embarcadero, the Spanish word for wharf, may also refer specifically to:

Places
 Embarcadero (San Diego), California
 Embarcadero Circle, waterfront re-development project in San Diego
 Embarcadero (San Francisco), a location on the eastern waterfront of San Francisco
 Embarcadero Center, office complex in San Francisco
 Embarcadero Freeway, former California State Route 480
 Embarcadero Station, an intermodal station serving mostly Muni services and BART

Transportation
 E Embarcadero, a suspended streetcar line in San Francisco

Brands and enterprises
 Embarcadero Technologies, developer tools and data management company